Intelcom Express (also known as Intelcom Courier Canada Inc.) is a Canadian courier and package delivery company headquartered in Montreal, Quebec. The company delivers nearly 500,000 parcels per day across Canada.

Intelcom’s clients include Amazon as well as Pitney Bowes and Landmark Global, which handle shipping for Etsy and eBay.

History
Daniel Hudon created the company in 1986 as a same-day delivery service for businesses.

In 2000, Canada Post bought 50% of Intelcom Express’ shares. The process was controversial, as the company had ties to the Liberal Party of Canada. Critics questioned the fairness of the decision-making process at Canada Post. These shares were repurchased by Intelcom Express in 2007.

In 2012, Intelcom Express entered the pharmaceutical delivery business with the purchase of Le Livreur Plus inc. and Eco Plus inc. services for the province of Quebec.

In 2015, Amazon tested Intelcom’s delivery services. Shortly thereafter, they signed on to expand the relationship across the country.  Intelcom then secured an investment from the Business Development Bank of Canada and the Caisse de dépôt et placement du Québec.

In late 2017 up to 2022, the company faced criticism for its practice of delivering packages by leaving them in places where they could be stolen. This criticism also extended to Amazon.ca, which had subcontracted the company to deliver Amazon Prime packages. Radio-Canada's consumer program, La Facture, broadcast a segment on Intelcom Express delivery practices in November 2017. The following month, Radio Canada International wrote about Christmas gift thieves and featured Intelcom Express delivery problems in condominiums.

In 2020, delivery drivers in Ontario filed complaint against Amazon, its subcontractor Intelcom Express, and the company that hires drivers for Intelcom Express, Seven Seas Services Inc., due to unsafe work conditions.

In 2021, Intelcom launched its subsidiary Dragonfly Shipping in Australia. Dragonfly Shipping became the first high-volume seven-day-a-week delivery service in Australia.

References 

Canadian companies established in 1986
Transport companies of Canada
Amazon (company)
Transport companies established in 1986
Companies based in Montreal